Hedrick's Grove Reformed United Church of Christ is a historic Reformed church located near Lexington, Davidson County, North Carolina.  It was established in 1891. The current sanctuary was built in 1921–1922, and is a large Romanesque Revival style brick structure.  It features a pair of corner towers of uneven height joined by a central arcaded loggia. Also on the property is a contributing church cemetery with approximately 375 graves.

The sanctuary was added to the National Register of Historic Places in 2008.

Located directly behind the sanctuary is the Educational Building, which holds Sunday School classrooms, offices, and a Fellowship Hall.

References

External links
Hedrick's Grove Reformed UCC Church Website
Hedrick's Grove Reformed UCC Church Facebook Page
Hedrick's Grove Reformed UCC Church YouTube Channel

United Church of Christ churches in North Carolina
Churches in Davidson County, North Carolina
Churches on the National Register of Historic Places in North Carolina
Romanesque Revival church buildings in North Carolina
Churches completed in 1922
20th-century United Church of Christ church buildings
National Register of Historic Places in Davidson County, North Carolina